Chávez Huerta K-12 Preparatory Academy is a charter school system in Pueblo, Colorado. It is divided into three campuses: César Chávez Academy (CCA), the elementary-middle school, ECMS the middle school and Dolores Huerta Preparatory High School (DHPH), the only charter high school in Pueblo.

History

The first graduating class in 2006 consisted of three students.

Athletics
The school's colors are blue and gold. The school's mascot is the scorpion which originated from a school-wide competition in 2004. The schools athletics uses the slogan "ScorpionStrong". The Scorpions field teams compete in the 3A Tri-Peaks East League in the Colorado High School Athletics Association (CHSAA).

Mariachi Aguila

The Chávez Huerta K-12 Preparatory Academy hosts a mariachi band program, called the Mariachi Aguila, made up of eleven student mariachi musicians. Mariachi Aguila was started at Cesar Chávez Academy shortly after its founding in 2001, and has travelled nationally and internationally, performing at folk music programs.

External links

References

Schools in Pueblo County, Colorado